Mid Cheshire is a former United Kingdom parliamentary constituency.

History 
Under the Reform Act 1867, the Parliamentary County of Cheshire was divided into three 2-member constituencies. This was achieved by the creation of Mid Cheshire which comprised the Hundred of Bucklow from North Cheshire and the Hundred of Northwich from South Cheshire.

Under the Redistribution of Seats Act 1885, the three 2-member seats were abolished and re-divided into eight single-member constituencies: Altrincham, Crewe, Eddisbury, Hyde, Knutsford, Macclesfield, Northwich and Wirral.

Boundaries
1868–1885: The Hundreds of Bucklow and Northwich.

Members of Parliament

Elections

Elections in the 1860s

Elections in the 1870s

Legh resigned, causing a by-election.

 

Leigh's death caused a by-election.

Elections in the 1880s

 

Egerton's elevation to the peerage, becoming Lord Egerton, caused a by-election.

See also
List of former United Kingdom Parliament constituencies
History of parliamentary constituencies and boundaries in Cheshire

References

Parliamentary constituencies in Cheshire (historic)
Constituencies of the Parliament of the United Kingdom established in 1868
Constituencies of the Parliament of the United Kingdom disestablished in 1885